"These Are the Days" is a song written by Northern Irish singer-songwriter Van Morrison and released on his 1989 album Avalon Sunset. It was released as the B-side of the single with "Orangefield" as the A-side.

Composition
The opening verse of the song is a recurring factor in Morrison's music and lyrics, the belief that the predominant sense of enjoyment and appreciation of life is to be found in the present moment:

Biographer John Collis writes that this final song pulls together all the concerns of the album:

Other releases
"These Are the Days" replaces "Caravan" as an iTunes bonus track, on Morrison's 2007 compilation album Van Morrison at the Movies – Soundtrack Hits.

In the media
"These Are the Days" was featured in the 1995 movie, Nine Months, starring Hugh Grant and Julianne Moore.

Personnel
Van Morrisonvocals, guitar
Arty McGlynnguitar
Neil Drinkwateraccordion, piano
Clive Culbertsonbass guitar
Roy Jones, Dave Earlydrums, percussion
Katie Kissoon, Carol Kenyonbacking vocals

References

Source
Collis, John (1996). Inarticulate Speech of the Heart, Little, Brown and Company, 

1989 songs
Songs written by Van Morrison
Van Morrison songs
Song recordings produced by Van Morrison